Konstantin Aleksandrovich Tyukavin (born 22 June 2002) is a Russian football player who plays as a striker or second striker for FC Dynamo Moscow and Russia.

Club career
He made his debut in the Russian Premier League for FC Dynamo Moscow on 1 November 2020 in a game against FC Tambov. He made his first start in their next game against FC Lokomotiv Moscow on 8 November.

On 20 February 2021, he scored his first goal for Dynamo in a 2–0 victory over FC Spartak Moscow in a Russian Cup game.

On 18 March 2021, he came on as a substitute in the 55th minute in the away game against FC Krasnodar, with Dynamo down 0–2. 11 minutes later he scored his first RPL goal for Dynamo that equalized the score, and in the 81st minute he scored the winning goal that established the final score of 3–2 for Dynamo. He was selected as player of the match. In Dynamo's next league game on 3 April 2021 against FC Ufa, Tyukavin scored a goal, assisted on another, and another Dynamo goal was scored on a rebound tap-in after the ball hit the goalpost after Tyukavin's header, as Dynamo won 4–0. He was selected as player of the match again. In the next game on 11 April 2021 against FC Ural Yekaterinburg, he assisted on both Dynamo goals in a 2–2 draw. Dynamo fans voted him Player of the Month for April 2021.

On 18 June 2021, he extended his contract with Dynamo for 3 additional seasons with an option for another season.

On 20 August 2022, Tyukavin scored the only goal of the game in an oldest Russian derby game against FC Spartak Moscow, securing the first Dynamo home league victory in this derby since 2008.

International career
On 20 March 2021, he was called up to the Russia U21 squad for the 2021 UEFA European Under-21 Championship.

He was called up to the Russia national football team for the first time for World Cup qualifiers against Croatia, Cyprus and Malta in September 2021. He made his debut on 4 September 2021 against Cyprus, substituting Fyodor Smolov in the 75th minute of a 2–0 away victory.

Personal life 
His father Aleksandr Tyukavin is a legendary bandy player who won the Bandy World Championship 8 times and Russian Bandy Super League 16 times.

Career statistics

References

External links
 
 

2002 births
People from Kotlas
Sportspeople from Arkhangelsk Oblast
Living people
Russian footballers
Russia youth international footballers
Russia under-21 international footballers
Russia international footballers
Association football forwards
FC Dynamo Moscow players
Russian Premier League players
Russian Second League players